The discography of The Calling, an American alternative rock band, consists of two studio albums, one compilation album and seven singles.

Albums

Studio albums

Compilation albums

Singles

Music videos

Notes

References

External links
The Calling at AllMusic

Discographies of American artists
Pop music group discographies
Rock music group discographies